Saticoy (Chumash: Sa'aqtik'oy) is an unincorporated community in Ventura County, California, United States. The settlement was laid out in 1887 along the railroad line that was being built from Los Angeles through the Santa Clara River Valley to the town of San Buenaventura. Although the town was  distant at that time, the City of Ventura grew to a point where the community is now just outside the city limits. For statistical purposes, the United States Census Bureau has defined Saticoy as a census-designated place (CDP).

The commercial district known as Old Town Saticoy is surrounded by a residential neighborhood with a population of just over one thousand. Two historic buildings attest to the important role Saticoy once held in the local agricultural economy: Walnut Growers Association Warehouse, and Saticoy (Lima) Bean Warehouse. The historic setting, stable residential population, railroad, and access to major highways make this community unique in Ventura County.

South towards the Santa Clara River is a sizable industrial area located on both sides of  Los Angeles Avenue. The historic building that formerly housed the Farmers & Merchants Bank of Santa Paula, Saticoy Branch, stands at a quiet intersection that used to be at the center of a vibrant community.

Name
The name comes from the Spanish rendering of the Ventureño Chumash village named Sa'aqtik'oy, meaning "it is sheltered from the wind".

History
The earliest known human inhabitants of the vicinity were the Oak Grove People. Some ancient mealing stones of this prehistoric tribe were found near Saticoy in 1932 and traced back to about 3000 B.C. In about the early 15th century, the Chumash tribe inhabited the area. They built canoes and milled the acorns.

Sa'aqtik'oy was one of the largest settlements of the Chumash region, which extended from Point Conception to Santa Monica and back into the foothills as far as the Coast Range. The natural underground springs located in the area made Saticoy a prime location for the tribe to hold their yearly meetings.

In 1769, the Spanish Portola expedition, first recorded European visitors to inland areas of California, came down the valley from the previous night's encampment near today's Santa Paula and camped in the vicinity of Saticoy on August 13. Fray Juan Crespi, a Franciscan missionary traveling with the expedition, noted that the party traveled about 6–7 miles that day and camped near a native village "composed of twenty houses made of grass, in a spherical form, like a half orange, with a vent at the top by which the light enters and the smoke goes out.".
 
Saticoy lies within the vast  Rancho Santa Paula y Saticoy granted to Manuel Jimeno Casarin on April 28, 1840 by the Mexican government.

In November 1861, Jefferson L. Crane settled at the site of the Chumash village, and other Americans followed soon after. Saticoy, which was then  from Ventura, had a school as early as 1868. W.D.F. Richards, considered the founder of Saticoy, arrived in 1868, and bought  of land. He contributed to the building up of the community and followed many experiments in farming.

The Saticoy Post Office was established in 1873 by the U.S. Post Office Department which was one of seventeen post offices operating in the county in 1890. R. G. Surdam was listed on the 1880 census for Saticoy with the occupation of real estate agent. He is known as the founder of the towns of Ojai and Bardsdale and for working with Thomas Bard to build the Hueneme wharf.

The streets and lots in the unincorporated present day "Old Town" were laid out in September 1887 on both sides of the newly opened "Southern Pacific Branch Line: Saugus to Santa Barbara."

An area west of Wells Road for which another map entitled "Town of Saticoy" was filed as a competing subdivision to benefit from the new railroad. Through the 1800s and early 1900s, very little development occurred in West Saticoy but the "Old Town" area flourished as a small center of the region’s citrus, bean and other produce production. Rail passenger service stopped in 1934.

The community of West Saticoy did develop a small community just west of the "School Lot" as shown on the map. Saticoy School was built on the lot in 1900. The school is now called ATLAS Elementary: Academy of Technology and Leadership at Saticoy and is part of the Ventura Unified School District.  This alternative townsite, on the other side of the Brown Barranca from the railroad station, was located on the main road to San Buenaventura. That distant town, incorporated in 1866, has grown so that all of Saticoy, except for "Old Town," has been annexed into the City of Ventura.

There have been many bridges across the Santa Clara River at Saticoy. They were often washed out due to abundant rainfall and flooding. The most notable washout, however, was due to the flood wave of water caused by the collapse of the St. Francis Dam, in northwest Los Angeles County, which occurred two and a half minutes before midnight on March 12, 1928. The bridge was washed out again in the flood of 1969, and cars were rerouted through the riverbed east of the bridge while it was under repair.

Cabrillo Village

Cabrillo Village was a  camp built in the 1930s. A lengthy confrontation in the 1970s ensued when the growers wanted to raze the cramped, rundown homes for development. The confrontation ended in 1976, when 82 farmworker families, advised by affordable housing advocate Rodney Fernandez, pitched in and bought their deteriorating cottages from the Saticoy Lemon Assn. It was perhaps the first time that U.S. farmworkers had purchased the camp they lived in." The first cooperative housing association in Ventura County was formed and the 154 apartments and houses in the village are owned by the cooperative. In 1989 Cabrillo Village was selected as a finalist for the Rudy Bruner Award for Urban Excellence. Eventually new housing tracts were built next to the community and it was annexed into the city of Ventura in 1994. The community is located between the river and the railroad tracks and is about equidistant from "Old Town" and West Saticoy.

Geography
Saticoy is near an apex of this compound alluvial fan formed by the river and Calleguas Creek. The Santa Clara River Valley opens up into the Oxnard Plain here as South Mountain on the south shore marks the end of the valley. Located on the fertile north bank of the Santa Clara River the shore of the Santa Barbara Channel is some 8 miles distant.  Agriculture in the area includes avocados, lemons, oranges, strawberries, and many other row crops. Along the shore of the Santa Clara River, amidst the agriculture area east and northeast of the town, is the Saticoy Oil Field, discovered in 1955 and operated by Vintage Petroleum.  The city of Ventura is adjacent to the community on the north and west side. The Census Bureau definition of the area does not precisely correspond to the local understanding of the historical area of the community.

Demographics
The 2010 United States Census reported that Saticoy had a population of 1,029. The racial makeup of Saticoy was 413 (40.1%) White, 9 (0.9%) African American, 29 (2.8%) Native American, 2 (0.2%) Asian, 0 (0.0%) Pacific Islander, 508 (49.4%) from other races, and 68 (6.6%) from two or more races. Hispanic or Latino of any race were 895 persons (87.0%).

The Census reported that 1,029 people (100% of the population) lived in households, 0 (0%) lived in non-institutionalized group quarters, and 0 (0%) were institutionalized.

There were 262 households, out of which 145 (55.3%) had children under the age of 18 living in them, 130 (49.6%) were opposite-sex married couples living together, 59 (22.5%) had a female householder with no husband present, 33 (12.6%) had a male householder with no wife present.  There were 22 (8.4%) unmarried opposite-sex partnerships, and 3 (1.1%) same-sex married couples or partnerships. 29 households (11.1%) were made up of individuals, and 9 (3.4%) had someone living alone who was 65 years of age or older. The average household size was 3.93.  There were 222 families (84.7% of all households); the average family size was 4.08.

The population was spread out, with 331 people (32.2%) under the age of 18, 133 people (12.9%) aged 18 to 24, 297 people (28.9%) aged 25 to 44, 177 people (17.2%) aged 45 to 64, and 91 people (8.8%) who were 65 years of age or older.  The median age was 28.0 years. For every 100 females, there were 109.1 males.  For every 100 females age 18 and over, there were 106.5 males.

The homeowner vacancy rate was 2.1%; the rental vacancy rate was 5.1%.  365 people (35.5% of the population) lived in owner-occupied housing units and 664 people (64.5%) lived in rental housing units.

Disadvantaged unincorporated community
The Ventura County Local Agency Formation Commission (LAFCo) determined in March 2012 that this unincorporated CDP with an estimated 2010 median household income of $34,145 was a "disadvantaged unincorporated community" (DUC)  under the state definition of an annual median household income that is less than 80 percent of the statewide annual median household income. Under state law, LAFCOs are required to make determinations regarding DUCs and an adjacent city's "Sphere of Influence" (SOI) and possible annexation restrictions of territory. SOIs demark the territory that represents the appropriate and probable future jurisdictional boundary and service area of the subject city.  Old Town Saticoy is within the city of Ventura's SOI and under state law, annexation would be mandatory before any other development areas are annexed. LAFCo determined that annexation at this time is not appropriate as the City would have to subsidize Saticoy to provide services that are incrementally better than the county now provides.

Parks and culture
The Saticoy library's one-room,  that had been used since 1973 was torn down in 1991 to make room for a new community center. The units had reached the end of their useful life in 2014 so a more centrally located,  at 1292 Los Angeles Avenue was remodeled into high-tech resource center.

Infrastructure

Transportation
State Route 118 curves through the southerly portion of the townsite although it formerly followed a zig-zag  route through the business district. State Route 118 heads northwest as Wells Road to terminate at the Santa Paula Freeway (State Route 126). Los Angeles Avenue is the name given to the highway as it heads east to connect with State Route 232.

Utilities
Water is provided by the City of Ventura. As the community is outside the corporate boundaries of the city, rates are typically about 20% higher than standard charged inside the city. The amount of multi-family, commercial, and industrial development/redevelopment that can occur within the community is limited as city policy limits new water meters to single family homes on existing lots.

The Saticoy Sanitation District, an independent special district which serves only the community of Saticoy, provides sanitary sewer service.

Notes

References

External links

Saticoy Springs Indian Village Historical Marker 
 
Saticoy Railroad Depot Historical Marker

Saticoy, California Data, with Map
Saticoy Library Website

1861 establishments in California
Populated places established in 1861
Census-designated places in Ventura County, California
Santa Clara River (California)
Census-designated places in California